Ali Motazed, also known as Ali Nakhjiri Esfahani, was Deputy head of SAVAK during the reign of Mohammad Reza Pahlavi.

Ali Motazed spent his primary and secondary school years in Isfahan and Nezam High School. In 1934, he entered the officer's college and in 1937, he graduated with the rank of second lieutenant in the field of artillery. Motazed served in the army headquarters until Pakravan's over Director of SAVAK, after which he was assigned to SAVAK and became the head of SAVAK's foreign intelligence service. He remained in this position throughout the 1960s. On June 8, 1978, when Nematollah Nassiri replaced with Nasser Moghaddam, he resigned from the position of SAVAK deputy and was sent to Syria as an ambassador.

Sources 

 Major General Ali Motazed
 Biography of SAVAK leaders

Imperial Iranian Army major generals
20th-century Iranian politicians
20th-century Iranian diplomats
Politicians from Tehran